The 2016 McDonald's All-American Boys Game was an All-star basketball game played on Wednesday, March 30, 2016 at the United Center in Chicago, Illinois, home of the Chicago Bulls. The game's rosters features the best and most highly recruited high school boys graduating in 2016. The game is the 39th annual version of the McDonald's All-American Game first played in 1977.

The 24 players were selected from 2,500 nominees by a committee of basketball experts. They were chosen not only for their on-court skills but for their performances off the court as well. Coach Morgan Wootten, who had more than 1,200 wins as head basketball coach at DeMatha Catholic High School, was chairman of the selection committee. Legendary UCLA coach John Wooden, who had been involved in the McDonald's All American Games since its inception, served as chairman of the Games and as an advisor to the selection committee.

Proceeds from the 2016 McDonald's All American High School Basketball Games will go to Ronald McDonald House Charities (RMHC) of Central Ohio and its Ronald McDonald House program.

Rosters
The rosters were announced on January 17. At the time of the roster announcement the 24 players included 22 of the top 25 players according to the 2016 ESPN 100. The two highest rated players (Jayson Tatum) were named to the East team. The West team roster was highlighted by (Josh Jackson). Duke signee Harry Giles would remain the No. 1 overall player in the 2016 high school class but was not eligible or invited to play due to an ACL tear at Oak Hill Academy which ended his senior year. Dennis Smith Jr. would become ineligible due to an injury before his senior year and enrolled early to NC State. ESPN's number 9 ranked and Florida State signee, Jonathan Isaac was an ineligible postgraduate student. Three other five-star recruits were also ineligible, number 15 ranked Rawle Alkins, number 16 ranked and Villanova signee, Omari Spellman, and number 24 ranked and Kentucky signee, Wenyen Gabriel. The highest ranked nominee not chosen was Auburn signee, Mustapha Heron.

On March 9, 2016, Lonzo Ball was named the Morgan Wootten award winner, an award given to the best male McDonald's All American player who presents an outstanding character, leadership and embodies the value of being a student-athlete in the classroom and the community. Kobi Simmons committed to Arizona on January 16 during the Spalding HoopHall Classic. On January 28, Udoka Azubuike committed to Kansas (joining Josh Jackson). On April 12, Josh Jackson committed to Kansas (joining Azubuike). On May 19, Marques Bolden selected Duke (joining Tatum and Frank Jackson). On June 3, Jarrett Allen committed to Texas (joining Jones).

Team West

  
The West team is coached by:
Dale Mabrey (Head Coach) (Pleasure Ridge Park High School, Louisville, KY)

Team East
 

The East team was coached by:
Jack Doss (head coach) (J.O. Johnson High School, Huntsville, AL)

^Player was uncommitted when the team was announced.

Box score

Josh Jackson and Frank Jackson led the West to a 114–107 victory with 19 points apiece.

Awards

During the Powerade Jam Fest held at the Chicago Theatre on March 28, Frank Jackson won the dunk contest, Malik Monk won the three-point contest and Jayson Tatum won the skills competition.

See also
2016 McDonald's All-American Girls Game

References

External links

roster on ESPN

2015–16 in American basketball
2016
2016 in sports in Illinois
Basketball in Illinois